Mark Kelly Hilton was a Republican member of the North Carolina General Assembly representing the state's ninety-sixth House district, including constituents in Catawba county. A police officer from Conover, North Carolina, Hilton served six terms in the state House.

A Catawba County native he began work with the NC Alcohol Beverage Commission as a Permit Compliance Officer in August 2013.

Electoral history

2010

2008

2006

2004

2002

2000

References

|-

|-

Republican Party members of the North Carolina House of Representatives
Living people
1966 births
21st-century American politicians
People from Valdese, North Carolina
People from Conover, North Carolina